Walter Roy Bruner (February 10, 1917 – November 30, 1986) was a Major League Baseball pitcher. In 19 career games, he had a 0–7 record with a 5.74 ERA. He batted and threw right-handed.

Bruner left baseball to serve in World War II. He was a bomber pilot in the war and was shot down on at least one occasion. After the war he owned Bruner Aluminum Company, which manufactured storm windows until he closed the business at his retirement.

References

External links

1917 births
1986 deaths
Philadelphia Phillies players
Baseball players from Kentucky
Major League Baseball pitchers
Baltimore Orioles (IL) players
Rochester Red Wings players
Birmingham Barons players